The Gliding Federation of Australia (GFA), also known as Gliding Australia, is the governing body for the sport of gliding in Australia.  It was founded in 1949.  The GFA is responsible to Civil Aviation Safety Authority for the conduct of safe gliding operations in Australia. This includes the setting and maintenance of flying standards and in particular training standards, for gliding and soaring flight in heavier-than-air fixed-wing gliders and sailplanes, powered sailplanes and touring motor gliders, but excluding flexible wing, weight shift hang gliders and paragliders. 

GFA / Gliding Australia provides services to its members such as:
 Regulatory issues covering pilot training, licensing and airworthiness handled under the delegations from the government regulatory body (CASA)
 Liaison with government agencies (such as Civil Aviation Safety Authority, Airservices Australia and Australian Transport Safety Bureau, particularly in terms of operations, safety, airspace access, occurrence investigations and management responsibilities
 Liaison with other sporting and recreational aviation bodies on matters of mutual interest (e.g. through Australian Sport Aviation Confederation)
 Arranging and managing liability insurance coverage for all members and clubs
 Awarding FAI badges and managing Australian gliding records
 Encouraging and staging competitions at regional, national and international levels
 Technical matters and technology development
 Promotion of gliding and soaring 
 Liaison with international gliding organisations (such as OSTIV and the FAI)
 Publishing a magazine Gliding Australia

In Australia, glider pilots are exempt from holding pilot licences but the GFA is responsible for the establishment of glider pilot certificates. These are regarded highly enough by CASA and the aviation industry to be considered as a satisfactory substitute for licences. Australian glider pilots wishing to fly gliders in other countries can convert their GFA Glider Pilot Certificates (GPC) to CASA–issued (and ICAO compliant) Glider Pilot Licences.

As the inclusion of 'Federation' in the name suggests, the GFA is a tiered structure based on regional associations, which are in turn based on gliding clubs. It is only possible to be a member of the GFA if one is also a member of a gliding club which is affiliated to the GFA through the applicable regional association. The five regional associations are
 Gliding Queensland (GQ), which covers all of Queensland and the northern New South Wales border region south to Byron Bay
 the New South Wales Gliding Association (NSWGA), which covers NSW except as noted above
 the South Australian Gliding Association (SAGA), which covers South Australia and the Northern Territory
 Victorian Soaring Association, which covers Victoria and Tasmania
 the West Australian Gliding Association (WAGA)

GFA in applying to the Civil Aviation Safety Authority (CASA) for formal recognition as an Approved Self-administering Aviation Organisation (ASAO) under CASR Part 149 legislation. https://www.casa.gov.au/search-centre/rules/part-149-casr-approved-self-administering-organisations

References

External links
 Gliding Federation of Australia
 https://glidingaustralia.org

Sports governing bodies in Australia
Gliding in Australia
Gliding associations
1949 establishments in Australia
Sports organizations established in 1949
Air sports